The geology of Cyprus is part of the regional geology of Europe. Cyprus lies on the southern border of the Eurasian Plate and on the southern margin of the Anatolian Plate. The southern margin of the Anatolian Plate is in collision with the African Plate, which has created the uplift of the Cyprus arc and Cyprus itself.

Bedrock geology
Cyprus is commonly divided into four bedrock units, which are illustrated in the small inset map at the right. From north to south they are:
Keryneia Terrane (blue)
Troodos Ophiolite (red), surrounded by the Circum Troodos Sedimentary Succession (orange)
Mamonia Terrane (green)

Keryneia Terrane
The Keryneia Terrane occupies the northern margin of Cyprus, stretching from Cape Kormakitis in the west to Cape Andreas in the east. The terrane is a sequence of Permian to recent sediments. The carbonate rocks are divided into the Dhikomo, the Hilarion and the Sykhari Formation.

Troodos Ophiolite

The Troodos Ophiolite crops out in the central part of Cyprus in a northwest to southeast striking band. The lithospheric mantle crops out in the Troodos mountains and in the Limassol Forest, Akapnou Forest, on the Akamas Peninsula and near Troullo. This slab of oceanic lithosphere was formed around 90 million years ago as part of the Neotethys seafloor (Meliata-Maliac-Vardar).

The Troodos Ophiolite is exceptional for the completeness of the section of oceanic lithosphere. The crust is composed of sheeted dykes, pillow basalts and marine sediments. The sediments are composed of deep-water shales and radiolarite. The mantle parts of the lithosphere are made of harzburgite and dunite (both peridotites), with about 50 to 80% of the minerals now transformed into serpentinite.

Mamonia Terrane
The Mamonia Terrane or Mamonia Complex is an assemblage of volcanic, sedimentary and metamorphic rocks. Outcrops are only found on the southwestern end of Cyprus (Paphos district).

It is thought that this assemblage was deposited between the Middle Triassic and the Upper Cretaceous and was thrust on to the southern margin of Cyprus from the Maastrichtian onwards well into the Cenozoic.

The Mamonia Terrane is divided into the Diarizos Group, the Agios-Fotios Group and the Agia-Varvara Formation.

Circum Troodos
The sediments that are autochthonous to Cyprus are called the Circum Troodos unit because they surround the Troodos. They were deposited between the Upper Cretaceous to the Pleistocene. Outcrops cover most of the island, with the exception of the Troodos mountains, which rise free. As a result of uplift the sediments become progressively more shallow marine.

Seismic activity

Because of its location on the margin of a tectonic plate, Cyprus is prone to earthquakes. The ongoing phase of seismicity since the Miocene, has caused an abundance of earthquakes.

See also
Leaky transform fault

References